Gudur revenue division is an administrative division in the Tirupati district of the Indian state of Andhra Pradesh. It is one of the four revenue divisions in the district with eight mandals under its administration. The divisional headquarters are located at Gudur.

History 

As of 2011 census, Gudur revenue division comprised 15 mandals: Balayapalle, Chillakur, Chittamur, Dakkili, Doravarisatram, Gudur, Kota, Manubolu, Naidupet, Ojili, Pellakur, Sullurpeta, Tada, Vakadu and Venkatagiri. In 2013, the six mandals of the division, namely, Doravarisatram, Naidupeta, Ojili, Pellakur, Sullurupeta and Tada were transferred to the Naidupeta revenue division.

Administration

The division was reorganized with 8 mandals effective from 4 April 2022: Balayapalle, Chillakur, Chittamur, Dakkili, Gudur, Kota, Vakadu and Venkatagiri.

See also 
List of revenue divisions in Andhra Pradesh
List of mandals in Andhra Pradesh
Tirupati district
Tirupati revenue division
Sullurupeta revenue division
Srikalahasti revenue division

References 

Revenue divisions in Tirupati district